Mulleriyawa is a city in the Western Province of Sri Lanka. It has a population of 33,540.

See also
 Battle of Mulleriyawa
 List of towns in Western Province, Sri Lanka

References 

Populated places in Western Province, Sri Lanka